Testosterone diacetate, or testosterone 3β,17β-diacetate, also known as 4-androstenediol diacetate, as well as androst-4-ene-3β,17β-diol 3β,17β-diacetate, is a synthetic anabolic-androgenic steroid and an androgen ester which was never marketed. It is the 3β,17β-diacetate diester of testosterone (androst-4-en-17β-ol-3-one), or, more accurately, of 4-androstenediol (androst-4-ene-3β,17β-diol).

See also
 Testosterone acetate butyrate
 Testosterone acetate propionate
 Testosterone dipropionate
 Bolandiol dipropionate
 Methandriol bisenanthoyl acetate
 Methandriol diacetate
 Methandriol dipropionate

References

Acetate esters
Androgens and anabolic steroids
Androstanes
Prodrugs
Testosterone esters
Abandoned drugs